The Bishop of Elmham is an episcopal title which was first used by an Anglo-Saxon bishop between the 7th and 11th centuries and is currently used by the Catholic Church for a titular see. The title takes its name after the small town of North Elmham in Norfolk, England.

Roman Catholic titular bishops

In 1969, the Catholic Church revived the title Bishop of Elmham, using Elmhama as the name of the titular see, but Helmamensis as the adjectival form in Contemporary Latin. The current titular bishop is the Most Reverend Eamonn Oliver Walsh, Auxiliary Bishop of Dublin who was appointed on 7 March 1990.

List of titular bishops

References

Elmhama